The Firm Man is a 1975 film which was the first directed by John Duigan.

Plot
Gerald Baxter, a middle aged businessman, starts a new job at a company called the Firm where his only jobs are collecting occasional messages. Gerald becomes bored and alienated from his life and wife. He befriends a girl who offers him another life but in the end conforms.

Cast
 Peter Cummins as Gerald Baxter
 Eileen Chapman as Melissa
 Bethany Lee as the girl
 Peter Carmondy as Barry
 Dianne Preston as Christie
 Sarah Chapman as Sally
 Marie Keenan as pub lady
 John Preston as Melissa's lover
 Max Gillies as managing director

Production
The film was shot in Victoria partly with funds provided by the Australia Council for the Arts. Filming took four weeks over the summer of 1974 using actors with whom Duigan had worked in the theatre.

References

External links
 
 The Firm Man at Oz Movies

1975 films
Australian drama films
Films directed by John Duigan
1975 directorial debut films
1970s English-language films
1970s Australian films